Europe is the debut studio album by Swedish heavy metal band Europe, released on 14 March 1983 by Hot Records.

Track listing

Personnel

Europe
Joey Tempest – vocals, acoustic guitars, keyboards
John Norum – guitars, background vocals
John Levén – bass
Tony Reno – drums

Production
Europe – producer
Erik Videgård – co-producer, engineer
Thomas Erdtman – co-producer
Lennart Dannstedt – photography
Camilla B. – cover design

Charts

References 

Europe (band) albums
1983 debut albums
JVC Records albums
Epic Records albums